Emil Steinberger may refer to:

Emil Steinberger (actor), Swiss comedian, writer, director and actor.
Emil Steinberger (endocrinologist), American endocrinologist.